Dagsbergs IF is a Swedish football club located in Ljunga. Founded in 1963 by Åke "Bajdoff" Johansson.

Background 
Dagsbergs IF currently plays in Division 3 Nordöstra Götaland which is the fifth tier of Swedish football. They play their home matches at the Dagsbergsvallen in Dagsberg.

Dagsbergs IF are affiliated to Östergötlands Fotbollförbund.

Players

First-team squad

Notable former players
 Anders Whass 
 Kim Hellberg

Records
Most played games:
  Jesper Jonsson, 218 games (2013–)
Most goals:
  Andreas Bengtsson, 181 goals (2011–2019)

Management

Technical staff
As of 30 December 2019

Season to season 

 League restructuring in 1987 and 2006 resulted in a new divisions being created and subsequent divisions dropping a level.

External links 
Dagsebergs IF – official site

References 

Football clubs in Östergötland County